WOLY (1450 kHz) is an AM radio station licensed to Olean, New York. The station is owned by Seven Mountains Media. It currently runs a 1970s to 1990s classic hits format branded as "Big Oly 107.1 and 105.5," branding itself after its two FM translators.

The station was issued an initial Construction Permit, with the sequentially issued call letters WHDL, in December 1928 to George F. Bissell in Tupper Lake, New York. In 1934 the station moved to Olean as the oldest station in Cattaraugus County, signing on there on December 11, 1934. It was affiliated with ABC since its days as the Blue Network through the early 2010s. Former congressman James F. Hastings managed WHDL from 1952 to 1966. The station was historically an oldies outlet known as "14 Karat Gold" since at least the 1980s, a format that was dropped in 2013 in favor of a 24-hour ESPN Radio feed, branded as "The Huddle" (a backronym of the station's long-established call sign).

On August 8, 2016, WHDL changed their format from ESPN sports to top 40/CHR, branded as "Hot 107.1" (simulcast on FM translator W296DB Olean, NY). The format change takes advantage of FCC regulations allowing an AM station to be broadcast on FM translators far removed from their city of license (the translator was relocated from Elmira).

On July 26, 2019, the station changed its call sign to WOLY, taking on a new call sign for the first time in its 90-year history. On July 29, 2019, WOLY changed their format from top 40/CHR to classic hits, branded as "Big Oly 107.1," returning the station to a format of older music. (The concept is loosely based on that of another Seven Mountains station, WLUI, which goes by "Big Lewie" in deference to its home city of Lewistown, Pennsylvania.) WPIG disc jockeys will serve double duty for the new format (including Gary Nease, who served as morning host during the 14 Karat Gold era and briefly reprised that role in Big Oly's opening months), which is attempting to compete with the markets's predominant classic hits outlet WXMT, another classic hits newcomer that changed later in 2019 after a change in ownership; and indirectly with rimshot classic hits outlet WHTT-FM, which also registered measurable listenership. WGWE eventually dropped out of the competition in 2021 after its owner (the Seneca Nation of Indians) withdrew its support for the station; in May 2022, Seven Mountains set up a translator for WOLY in Salamanca on 105.5, a short distance down the dial from WGWE's former frequency of 105.9. The 105.5 translator broadcasts from the tower of sister station WQRS.

Programming
WOLY shares much of its programming with sister stations WZHD, WPHD-FM, WLUI, WKYL and WOGA, including morning host Lee Richey, midday host Nancy Plum, and afternoon host Chris Randolph. Compass Media Networks' The Night Shift with Craig Allen airs in evenings.

Translators
WOLY simulcasts on these two FM translators:

References

External links

OLY (AM)
Classic hits radio stations in the United States
Radio stations established in 1929
1929 establishments in New York (state)